Dugard is an English surname, probably coming from the French dieu (te) garde (God protect you), via the surnames Dieutegarde, Deugard and du Gard. People with the surname include:

 Jaycee Dugard (born 1980), 1991 American kidnapping victim
 John Dugard (born 1936), South African professor of international law
 Martin Dugard (author) (born 1961), American author
 Martin Dugard (speedway rider) (born 1969), former British motorcycle speedway rider
 Robert Dugard (1942–2018), English motorcycle speedway rider and promoter
 William Dugard (1606–1662), English schoolmaster and printer

See also
Gard (disambiguation)